Natasha Bianca Lyonne Braunstein (born April 4, 1979) is an American actress and filmmaker. She is known for playing Nicky Nichols on the Netflix comedy-drama series Orange Is the New Black (2013–2019), for which she received an Emmy Award nomination for Outstanding Guest Actress, and for her portrayal of Nadia Vulvokov on the Netflix series Russian Doll (2019–present), which she also co-created, executive produces, writes, and directs. For the latter, Lyonne has received nominations for three Emmy Awards, including Outstanding Lead Actress in a Comedy Series. She is currently starring in the Peacock mystery series Poker Face.

Lyonne made her feature film debut in 1986, with a small, uncredited appearance in Heartburn. She gained prominence portraying Jessica in the American Pie film series (1999–2012). She has since starred in such films as Slums of Beverly Hills (1998), But I'm a Cheerleader (1999), Die, Mommie, Die! (2003), and Antibirth (2016). She is also known for supporting roles in Dennis the Menace (1993), Everyone Says I Love You (1996), Kate & Leopold (2001), Party Monster (2003), Sleeping with Other People (2015), Honey Boy (2019), Ad Astra (2019), and The United States vs. Billie Holiday (2021). She voiced Merton in the animated film DC League of Super-Pets (2022).

Early life
Lyonne was born in New York City, the daughter of Ivette Buchinger and Aaron Braunstein, a boxing promoter, race car driver and radio host. Lyonne's parents were from Orthodox Jewish families, and she was raised Orthodox. Her mother was born in Paris, France, to Hungarian-Jewish parents who were Holocaust survivors. Lyonne has joked that her family consists of "my father's side, Flatbush, and my mother's side, Auschwitz." Her grandmother Ella came from a large family, but only she and her two sisters and two brothers survived, which Lyonne has attributed to their blond hair and blue eyes. Lyonne's grandfather Morris Buchinger operated a watch company in Los Angeles. During the war, he hid in Budapest as a non-Jew working in a leather factory. 

Lyonne lived the first eight years of her life in Great Neck, New York. She and her family then emigrated to Israel, where she spent a year and a half. While in Israel, Lyonne participated in the 1989 Israeli children's film April Fool, which began her interest in acting. Her parents divorced, and Lyonne and her older brother, Adam, returned to America with their mother. After moving back to New York City, Lyonne attended the Ramaz School, a private Jewish school, where Lyonne said she was a scholarship kid who took honors Talmud classes and read Aramaic. She was expelled for selling marijuana at school. Lyonne grew up on the Upper East Side, where she felt she was an outcast. Her mother moved their family to Miami, where Lyonne attended Miami Country Day School. She did not graduate from high school, leaving before her senior year to attend a film program at New York University's Tisch School of the Arts, which she attended for a short time, studying film and philosophy. Her high school graduation depended on completing her first year at Tisch, but she left the program because she could not pay the tuition.

Lyonne was estranged from her father, who was a Democratic candidate for New York City Council for the sixth District of Manhattan in 2013, and lived on the Upper West Side until his death in October 2014. She has said she is not close to her mother and has essentially lived independently of her family since age 16.

Career 
As a young child, Lyonne was signed by the Ford Modeling Agency. At age six, she was cast as Opal on Pee-wee's Playhouse, followed by film appearances in Heartburn, A Man Called Sarge, and Dennis the Menace. Of working as a very young child actor, Lyonne has said: "I didn't have the best parents. I don't think they are bad people. Even if they were ready to have children, it is kind of a wacky idea to put your child in business at six years old."

Film 

At age 16, Lyonne was cast in the Woody Allen-directed Everyone Says I Love You (1996). This led to appearances in a variety of films over the next 10 years, including starring roles in the independent features Slums of Beverly Hills (1998), for which she received two Teen Choice Award nominations, and But I'm a Cheerleader (1999). During this time, she appeared as Jessica in the highly successful teen comedy American Pie (1999), reprising the role in two of its sequels. Lyonne's other films during this period included Detroit Rock City, Freeway II: Confessions of a Trickbaby (both 1999), Scary Movie 2, The Grey Zone, Kate & Leopold (all 2001), Party Monster (2003), and Blade: Trinity (2004). Her later film appearances include All About Evil (2010), 4:44 Last Day on Earth (2011), Girl Most Likely, Loitering with Intent, Sleeping with Other People, Hello, My Name Is Doris, Addicted to Fresno, #Horror, Yoga Hosers, Antibirth, The Intervention, Handsome: A Netflix Mystery Movie, and Honey Boy. She also made a cameo appearance as herself in the 2022 Netflix film Glass Onion: A Knives Out Mystery.

Theater 
Lyonne made her New York stage debut in the award-winning New Group production of Mike Leigh's Two Thousand Years.

She was part of the original cast of the award-winning Love, Loss, and What I Wore, a play by Nora Ephron and Delia Ephron, based on the book by Ilene Beckerman.

In 2010, Lyonne received positive reviews for her performance in Kim Rosenstock's comedy Tigers Be Still at the Roundabout Theatre Company: "a thorough delight in the flat-out funniest role, the grief-crazed Grace, so deeply immersed in self-pity that she has cast aside any attempts at decorum".

In 2011, Lyonne starred opposite Ethan Hawke and Ann Dowd in New Group's production of Tommy Nohilly's Blood from a Stone. The next year, she participated in New Group's benefit performance of Women Behind Bars.

Of working in the theater, Lyonne has said, "There's something about theater that squashes the self-critical voices because you have to be in the moment. I'm glad that I didn't do this before I was ready before I was capable of showing up every day. That is not a skill set I had before".

Television 
Lyonne has made guest appearances on the series Grounded for Life, Weeds, New Girl, Will & Grace, and Law & Order: Special Victims Unit.

From 2013 to 2019, she appeared as Nicky Nichols in the Netflix series Orange Is the New Black. The role was Lyonne's first television job as a series regular. She received a nomination for the Primetime Emmy Award for Outstanding Guest Actress in a Comedy Series in 2014, and was twice awarded the Screen Actors Guild Award for Outstanding Performance by an Ensemble in a Comedy Series, along with her co-stars.

In 2014, Lyonne was cast in Amy Poehler's comedy pilot Old Soul, directed by David Wain. In 2016, she began voicing the character Smoky Quartz on the Cartoon Network show Steven Universe. She has appeared as various characters on IFC's comedy series Portlandia. In 2018, she voiced the character Gaz Digzy on Adult Swim's comedy series Ballmastrz: 9009. She has voiced characters on The Simpsons and Netflix's Big Mouth.

Her performance in the 2019 Netflix series Russian Doll has been praised as "astonishing". Alan Sepinwall of Rolling Stone called it "brilliant". The series received 13 Emmy nominations, including Outstanding Comedy Series, Outstanding Lead Actress in a Comedy Series for Lyonne's performance as Nadia Vulvokov, and Outstanding Writing for a Comedy Series.

She stars in Poker Face, which premiered in 2023.

Directing and producing 
In 2017, Lyonne was approached by Kenzo's creative directors Carol Lim and Humberto Leon to direct the 5th installment in their short film series. For this, her directorial debut, she began writing a script with Maya Rudolph in mind to star. The surrealist short film was titled Cabiria, Charity, Charlotte and starred Rudolph, Fred Armisen, Greta Lee, Leslie Odom Jr. and Macaulay Culkin.

In September 2017, Lyonne's project Russian Doll was given an eight-episode straight-to-series order by Netflix. The comedy, co-created and executive produced by Lyonne, Amy Poehler, and Leslye Headland, premiered on February 1, 2019. Lyonne has multiple roles in the series. She is credited as the lead actress and is one of the series's executive producers with directorial and writing credits.

In 2018, Lyonne and Rudolph co-founded the production company Animal Pictures. Its first greenlit project was Sarah Cooper: Everything's Fine, which Lyonne directed. The company also produces Russian Doll, Poker Face, Loot, and the upcoming animated series The Hospital.

Lyonne directed an episode of Orange Is the New Black in its seventh and final season, an episode of Hulu's Shrill, titled "WAHAM", and an episode of High Fidelity, titled "Weird...But Warm".

Personal life 
When she was 18, Lyonne used the paycheck from her work on Everyone Says I Love You to buy a small apartment near Gramercy Park. During the early 2000s, she experienced legal problems and was arrested for driving under the influence of alcohol, and for incidents involving her neighbors. In 2005, she was evicted by her landlord, actor Michael Rapaport, following complaints by other tenants about her behavior.

In 2005, Lyonne was admitted (under a pseudonym) to Beth Israel Medical Center in Manhattan, suffering from hepatitis C, infective endocarditis, and a collapsed lung; she was also undergoing methadone treatment for heroin addiction. In January 2006, a warrant was issued for her arrest after she missed a court hearing relating to her prior legal problems. Her lawyer said an emergency had arisen but did not give details. Later that year, Lyonne was admitted to a drug and alcohol treatment center, and she appeared in court afterward. A judge entered a conditional discharge.

Lyonne underwent open-heart surgery in 2012 to correct heart valve damage caused by her heart infection, which could have resulted in sudden death if untreated. She recovered from the surgery and discussed her past health problems on The Rosie Show in March 2012.

Lyonne lives in New York City's East Village. She and Saturday Night Live alumnus Fred Armisen began dating in 2014, but in April 2022, Lyonne confirmed they had ended their relationship.

Filmography

Film

Television

Music videos

Awards and nominations

See also 
 The song "Natasha" from Want One by Rufus Wainwright was written for and about Lyonne.

References

External links 

 

1979 births
Hungarian Orthodox Jews
American Orthodox Jews
20th-century American actresses
21st-century American actresses
Actresses from New York City
American child actresses
American expatriates in Israel
American film actresses
American people of Hungarian-Jewish descent
American television actresses
American voice actresses
Jewish American actresses
Living people
People from the Upper East Side
Ramaz School alumni
Tisch School of the Arts alumni
People from Great Neck, New York
People from Gramercy Park
American women television directors
American television directors
Miami Country Day School alumni